Estadio José Nasazzi is a multi-use stadium in Montevideo, Uruguay.  It is currently used primarily for football matches.  The stadium holds 10,000 people. It is the home stadium of C.A. Bella Vista.

References

J
Jose Nasazzi
C.A. Bella Vista
Prado, Montevideo